Hold It Down is an album by the American band Madball, released in 2000.

Critical reception
The Courier News wrote that the album "is as loud, fast and hard as ever, but the 11-year-old band also is writing songs better with more emphasis on strong lyrics and melodies."

Track listing

Personnel
Bass – Hoya Roc
Design Concept [Cover Concept] – Madball
Drums – Darren Morgenthaler
Executive producer – Roger Miret
Guitar – Rob Rosario
Guitar [additional] – Matt Henderson
Mastered by Tim Gilles
Mixed by Dan Iannuzzelli
Other [Interlude Beats] – LDee (tracks: 13, 14)
Photography by Dario Franco, Tom Aldi
Photography Artwork [Art], Layout – Joe Darone
Producer – Matt Henderson
Recorded by Jason Kanter
Recorded by (assistant) – Erin Farley
Vocals – Freddy Cricien

References

External links
 Discogs.com entry

Madball albums
2000 albums
Epitaph Records albums
Rapcore albums